Mary McCoy, professionally known as Maimie McCoy is an English actress. She portrayed Milady de Winter in The Musketeers (2014–2016), and is the female lead in the ITV reboot series Van der Valk (2020–).

Early life
McCoy was born in Yorkshire, where she attended Stokesley School. Initially a dancer, she then studied Performing Arts at London Metropolitan University, graduating with a BA (Hons) in 2001. McCoy is the daughter of restaurateurs Eugene and Barbara McCoy, once managers of Tontine restaurant near Stokesley, who now run the Crathorne Arms pub in Crathorne, North Yorkshire. Her elder brother Rory is the owner of London restaurants Ducksoup and The Picklery Little Duck, and her younger brother is actor, singer and dancer Eugene McCoy. Her maternal uncle is the impressionist Kevin Connelly.

Career
McCoy's extensive screen career includes episodes of Doctors, The Bill, Waking the Dead and Taggart.

In 2009, she appeared in Personal Affairs as Nicole Palmerston-Amory, a "man-eating, cynical realist (who) favours money over love". This was McCoy's first leading role, for which she was nominated for a TV Quick Award as best supporting actress.

In December 2012, McCoy played the role of the younger Joyce Hatto in the BBC's production of Loving Miss Hatto.

In April 2013, she appeared in "Rocket", the third episode of Endeavour, playing Alice Vexin, an old student acquaintance of Morse's. Later that year, she starred in the short film Fare with Christian Cooke. She has since appeared as the female lead, Milady de Winter, in the BBC's The Musketeers (2014–2016), as Dorothy in Channel 5's remake series All Creatures Great and Small (2020–present) and as the female lead, opposite Marc Warren, in the ITV reboot series Van Der Valk.

Personal life
McCoy runs "Mary Tea Parties", a cake business.

Filmography

Theatre
The French Lieutenant's Woman, Richmond Theatre, October 2006 (playing Mary/Girl/Catherine)

References

External links

Living people
Alumni of London Metropolitan University
People from Hambleton District
English television actresses
English film actresses
English stage actresses
1979 births
21st-century English actresses
Actresses from Yorkshire
People from Northallerton